A sugarloaf was the usual form in which refined sugar was produced and sold until the late 19th century, when granulated and cube sugars were introduced. A tall cone with a rounded top was the end product of a process in which dark molasses, a rich raw sugar that was imported from sugar-growing regions such as the Caribbean and Brazil, was refined into white sugar.

History 

The earliest record to date appears to be 12th century in Jordan, though reference to a cone of sugar is found in al-Zubayr ibn Bakkar's 9th century Arabic Al-Akhbar al-Muwaffaqiyyat. In Europe, they were made in Italy from 1470, Belgium 1508, England 1544, The Netherlands 1566, Germany 1573 and France 1613. When refining from sugar beet began in mainland Europe in 1799, loaves were produced in the same way.

Until the mid-19th century, the British government used a system of punitive taxes to make it impossible for its colonial producers in the Caribbean to refine their own sugar and supply Britain with finished sugarloaves. Previously the Amsterdam industry had been similarly protected from the importation of East India white sugar. Instead, a dark raw sugar or muscovado, produced on the plantations by initial boilings of the fresh cane juice, was shipped in hogsheads to Europe on what was the third leg of the Triangular Trade.

The sugarloaf was also the sign of a grocer, often found outside his premises or in the window, and sometimes found on his trade tokens.

Process 
The raw sugar was refined by a series of boiling and filtering processes. After the final boiling, it was considered ready for granulation and was poured into a large number of inverted conical molds. These were usually made of either brown  earthenware or sheet iron with an internal treatment of slip or paint respectively, and each stood in its own collecting pot. Over the next few days most of the dark syrup and noncrystalline matter drained through a small hole in the bottom of the mould into the collecting pot. To improve the whiteness of the sugar, repeated applications of either a solution of white clay or of loaf sugar dissolved in warm water was applied to the broad end of the loaf. This slowly drained through the loaf, readily uniting with any remaining molasses or other coloring matter and removing it to the collecting pot. The loaves were then tapped out of the molds, dried in a store room containing hundreds of loaves, trimmed to their final shape and wrapped, usually in blue paper to enhance their white appearance.

Grades 

The molds, and so the sugarloaves, varied in size considerably: the larger the loaf the lower the grade of sugar. The grade determined the price, though loaves were sold by weight and the sugar refiner was taxed on the weight of sugar sold. When a new batch of raw sugar was refined, the best sugar came from the first boiling. After that, the waste and trimmings from the first boiling were returned to the beginning of the process and mixed with further raw sugar for the second boiling, and, as this was repeated to the end of the batch, subsequent boilings reduced slightly in quality. The lowest standard refined grades were called bastards, though an even lower grade was often produced from the filtration scums, usually by a scum-boiler at his own separate premises.

Contemporary availability
While mostly superseded by granulated and cube sugar, sugarloaves are still produced as specialty items. They are particularly common in Germany, where small loaves are a required ingredient for the Christmas season drink Feuerzangenbowle.

See also 
 Jaggery
 List of mountains named Sugarloaf
 Panela
 Peen tong – a Chinese slab brown sugar and sugar candy

References

External links 
 

Sugar